The French Creek Wildlife Area is a  tract of protected land located in Columbia County and Marquette County, Wisconsin, managed by the Wisconsin Department of Natural Resources (WDNR). Land to be used for the wildlife area was first acquired in 1947 to provide for increased production of wildfowl and hunting opportunities. Prior to 1947, the area was used for the cultivation of wire grass which is used for the creation of grass rugs and mats.

French Creek
The French Creek Wildlife Area is trisected into three different areas; the all-encompassing French Creek Wildlife Area, the French Creek North Natural Area, and the French Creek Fen Natural Area. The French Creek North Natural Area is a  exclave of the wildlife area consisting of mostly wetland and some shallow open water sections.

There are 14 different types of cover in the wildlife area, including agriculture, aspen, central hardwood, developed, forested wetland, grassland, marsh, oak woodland, shrub wetland, tamarack, upland conifer, upland shrub, water, and the most common, sedge meadows.

Flora and fauna
The most prominent species of trees that can be found in the wildlife area are oak and tamarack, in addition to various other hardwood trees native to the region. The wildlife area is otherwise dominated by sedges, a grass-like plant.

A popular activity in the wildlife area is hunting, with there being a sizable population of deer, turkey, and other wildfowl in the area. There is currently a pheasant restocking program in the wildlife area, which furthers the agenda of turning the area into a sustainable hunting preserve.

See also
 Wildlife management

References

External Links
 U.S. Geological Survey Map at the U.S. Geological Survey Map Website. Retrieved March 8th, 2022.

State Wildlife Area
Protected areas of Wisconsin
Geography of Columbia County, Wisconsin
Protected areas established in 1947